Anton Marius Jenssen (27 November 1879 – 25 July 1967) was a Norwegian merchant and politician.

He was born in Herning, Denmark to mill owner Anders Christen Jensen and Else Kirstine Olesen. He emigrated to Norway in 1894, and settled first in Horten, and from 1901 as merchant in Tønsberg. He was elected representative to the Storting for the periods 1925–1927, 1928–1930, 1931–1933, 1934–1936 and 1937–1945, for the Labour Party. He was member of the municipal council of Tønsberg from 1910 to 1936.

References

1879 births
1967 deaths
People from Herning Municipality
Danish emigrants to Norway
Norwegian businesspeople
Labour Party (Norway) politicians
Members of the Storting
Politicians from Tønsberg